Văn Ngọc Tú (11 August 1987, Sóc Trăng) is a Vietnamese judoka who competes in the women's 48 kg category. She was a four-time gold medalist at the Southeast Asian Games as well was a one-time silver medalist between 2005 and 2013. She also won a bronze medal at the 2011 Asian Judo Championships. At the 2012 Summer Olympics, she was defeated in the first round by future gold medalist of the event, Sarah Menezes. At the 2016 Summer Olympics, she was eliminated in the second round by Jeong Bo-kyeong. After this, she announced her retirement from competition.

References

External links
 

1987 births
Living people
People from Sóc Trăng province
Vietnamese female judoka
Olympic judoka of Vietnam
Judoka at the 2012 Summer Olympics
Judoka at the 2016 Summer Olympics
Judoka at the 2006 Asian Games
Judoka at the 2010 Asian Games
Judoka at the 2014 Asian Games
Kurash practitioners at the 2018 Asian Games
Asian Games competitors for Vietnam
Southeast Asian Games medalists in judo
Southeast Asian Games gold medalists for Vietnam
Southeast Asian Games silver medalists for Vietnam
Competitors at the 2005 Southeast Asian Games
Competitors at the 2007 Southeast Asian Games
Competitors at the 2009 Southeast Asian Games
Competitors at the 2011 Southeast Asian Games
Competitors at the 2013 Southeast Asian Games
21st-century Vietnamese women
20th-century Vietnamese women